Barbara Gemma Mogae  is a Botswana public figure and politician who served as the third First Lady of Botswana from 1998 until 2008. She is the wife of former President Festus Mogae.

Biography
Mogae was born Barbara Gemma Modise. She married her husband, Festus Mogae, in 1967. The couple have three daughters born between 1969 and 1987 namely Nametso, Chedza and Boikaego.

First Lady
Barbara Mogae served as the country's third First Lady from 1998 until 2008.

Honors
On 29 September 2016 Mogae was honored with the Golden Jubilee Presidential Order of Honour Award by President Ian Khama as one of the "Builders of Botswana." Other recipients included her husband, Festus Mogae; posthumous honors for the late former First Ladies Ruth Williams Khama and Gladys Olebile Masire; the late former President Seretse Khama, former President Quett Masire; and the 28 members of the country's first, post-independence Parliament.

References

Living people
Year of birth missing (living people)
First ladies of Botswana